Nedim Đedović (born February 16, 1997) is a Bosnian professional basketball player who last played for Sáenz Horeca Araberri of the LEB Oro. He is a 205 cm tall small forward. He is the younger brother of basketball player Nihad Đedović.

References 

1997 births
Living people
Sportspeople from Munich
Araberri BC players
Bosnia and Herzegovina expatriate basketball people in Spain
Bosnia and Herzegovina men's basketball players
FC Barcelona Bàsquet players
FC Barcelona Bàsquet B players
Small forwards